The 1924 United States Senate election in Minnesota took place on November 4, 1924. Republican U.S. Representative Thomas D. Schall defeated incumbent Farmer–Labor U.S. Senator Magnus Johnson and Democratic challenger John J. Farrell. Johnson, who was elected in the 1923 special election, had been in office for less than a year and a half when his attempt to win a full six-year term was defeated by Schall.

Farmer–Labor primary

Candidates

Declared
 Hjalmar Dantes, Resident of Orr, endorsed by the state Communist Party
 Michael Ferch, Banker and farmer from Minneapolis, Republican nominee for the 56th Senate District in 1906, Independent Progressive candidate for Governor in 1924
 Magnus Johnson, Incumbent U.S. Senator since 1923

Results

Republican primary

Candidates

Declared
 Oscar Hallam, Associate justice of the Minnesota Supreme Court since 1912
 Ole Sageng, former State Senator from the 50th district (1915-1923) and 59th district (1907-1915), and former State Representative from the 59th district (1901-1903)
 Thomas D. Schall, U.S. Representative from Minnesota's 10th congressional district since 1915

Results

General election

Results

See also 
 United States Senate elections, 1924 and 1925

References

Minnesota
1924
1924 Minnesota elections